Jordan Elliott may refer to:

 Jordan Elliott (born 1997), American football defensive tackle
 Jordan Elliot, fictional identity of Superman in the comic book "Superman: Whatever Happened to the Man of Tomorrow?"